Brian Idalski (born January 23, 1971) is an American ice hockey coach, currently serving as head coach of the St. Cloud State Huskies women's ice hockey program in the Western Collegiate Hockey Association (WCHA) conference of the NCAA Division I. He served as head coach of the Chinese women's team the Shenzhen KRS Vanke Rays in the Zhenskaya Hockey League (ZhHL) during 2019 to 2022, twice winning the ZhHL Championship with the team, and was the head coach of the now-defunct North Dakota Fighting Hawks women's ice hockey team for ten seasons.

Idalski was head coach of the Chinese women's national team that participated in the women's ice hockey tournament at the 2022 Winter Olympics in Beijing. The team qualified as the national host country.

Head coaching record

References

External links
Brian Idalski bio at fightingsioux.com

1971 births
Living people
Wisconsin–Stevens Point Pointers men's ice hockey players
Wisconsin–Stevens Point Pointers men's ice hockey coaches
Wisconsin–Stevens Point Pointers women's ice hockey coaches
St. Cloud State Huskies women's ice hockey coaches
North Dakota Fighting Hawks women's ice hockey coaches
St. Louis Vipers players
Madison Monsters players
Columbus Cottonmouths (CHL) players
American men's ice hockey defensemen
American ice hockey coaches
American expatriate ice hockey people in China
American expatriate ice hockey people in Russia